Léon Lécuyer (8 April 1855 – 25 October 1915) was a French sports shooter. He competed in fencing at the 1900 Summer Olympics. He also competed in three events at the 1908 Summer Olympics winning a bronze medal in the team small-bore rifle event.

References

1855 births
1915 deaths
French male sport shooters
Olympic shooters of France
Fencers at the 1900 Summer Olympics
Shooters at the 1908 Summer Olympics
Olympic bronze medalists for France
Olympic medalists in shooting
Medalists at the 1908 Summer Olympics
Sport shooters from Paris